Felix Orode (born 28 July 1990, in Lagos) is a Nigerian professional football midfielder. Besides Nigeria, he has played in Spain, Argentina, and Peru.

Career

Club career
At the age of 14, Orode scored a goal in Nigeria's First Division on April 24, 2004, playing for the Mighty Jets against Plateau United.

After going through the Mighty Jet in Nigeria, he was discovered by FIFA agent Marcelo Houseman, who took him to Lleida from Spain in 2009, where he was selected to train with the squad. That same year, he went to San Lorenzo, from the First Division of Argentina, which bought 40% of his pass. On November 21, he debuted with the first team, replacing Diego Rivero, against Huracán, at Parque Patricios, a match in which he gave Juan Manuel Torres a great assist in his team's second goal.
He participated in the reserve tournament being a scorer of the same.

After the announcement of coach Diego Simeonede that was not going to be taken into account for the next tournament of the year 2010, the Nigerian player was given a loan to Nueva Chicago, of the Metropolitan B, where he played several matches reaching good performances.

In June 2010, he signed for the Comodoro Rivadavia CAI playing in the National B tournament.
At the beginning of 2012 he was transferred to Excursionistas, where he played in many matches in the Primera C tournament and even in the Copa Argentina. In the second semester of 2012, he was signed by Luján. In mid-2013 he arrived at Comunicaciones, where he was directed by Jorge Vivaldo. In 2014 he had a brief stint in the Walter Ormeño Sports Club of the second division of Peru and that same year he returned to Excursionistas. He found it in 2016 playing in Sportivo Barracas de la Primera C, of Argentine soccer.

In 2017 he signed for Depro, from the province of Entre Ríos, with which he disputes the Federal Tournament A third division of Argentine soccer.

References

External links
 Profile at BDFA 
 
 

1990 births
Living people
Nigerian footballers
Nigerian expatriate footballers
Mighty Jets F.C. players
Sharks F.C. players
Lleida Esportiu footballers
Nueva Chicago footballers
San Lorenzo de Almagro footballers
Comisión de Actividades Infantiles footballers
CA Excursionistas players
Club Comunicaciones footballers
Walter Ormeño de Cañete players
Sportivo Barracas players
Gimnasia y Esgrima de Mendoza footballers
Argentine Primera División players
Primera Nacional players
Primera B Metropolitana players
Primera C Metropolitana players
Peruvian Segunda División players
Torneo Argentino A players
Association football midfielders
Nigerian expatriate sportspeople in Spain
Nigerian expatriate sportspeople in Argentina
Expatriate footballers in Spain
Expatriate footballers in Argentina
Expatriate footballers in Peru